Sumner Getchell (October 20, 1906 – September 21, 1990) was an American film actor. He appeared in more than 60 films between 1926 and 1953. He was born in Oakland, California, and died in Sebastopol, California.

Partial filmography

 The College Widow (1927) - Jimmie Hopper
 Pirates of the Pines (1928)
 The Air Circus (1928) - (uncredited)
 The Flying Fleet (1929) - Kewpie (uncredited)
 New Year's Eve (1929) - Edward's Friend
 College Love (1929) - Fat
 Cheer Up and Smile (1930) - Paul
 Maybe It's Love (1930) - Whiskers
 Man to Man (1930) - Jerry (uncredited)
 Don't Bet on Women (1931) - Office Boy (uncredited)
 Daybreak (1931) - Emil
 Pleasure (1931) - Slug - Party Guest (uncredited)
 Crooner (1932) - Teddy's Band Member (uncredited)
 That's My Boy (1932) - Carl
 Vanity Street (1932) - Scottie (uncredited)
 The Son-Daughter (1932) - Dr. Dong's Servant (uncredited)
 Her First Mate (1933) - Wise Guy (uncredited)
 This Side of Heaven (1934) - Gus - Fraternity Member (uncredited)
 The Cat and the Fiddle (1934) - Conservatory Trumpeter (uncredited)
 Coming Out Party (1934) - Tubby, Party Guest (uncredited)
 I Give My Love (1934) - Fat Boy (uncredited)
 Desirable (1934) - Frederick (uncredited)
 Death on the Diamond (1934) - Man on Ticket Line (uncredited)
 Babes in Toyland (1934) - Little Jack Horner (uncredited)
 Clive of India (1935) - Clerk (uncredited)
 The Great Hotel Murder (1935) - Bunny (uncredited)
 Go Into Your Dance (1935) - Young Man in Elevator (uncredited)
 Circus Shadows (1935) - Dale's Friend
 Chinatown Squad (1935) - Fat Boy Tourist (uncredited)
 The Girl Friend (1935) - French Soldier in Play (uncredited)
 Magnificent Obsession (1935) - Jimmy (uncredited)
 The Adventures of Frank Merriwell (1936, Serial) - Harry
 Pick a Star (1937) - Contest Judge (uncredited)
 There Goes the Groom (1937) - Billy Rapp
 Battle of Broadway (1938) - Bakery Boy (uncredited)
 Crime Ring (1938) - Reporter with Black Eye (uncredited)
 My Lucky Star (1938) - Student Messenger
 Campus Confessions (1938) - 'Blimp' Garrett
 These Glamour Girls (1939) - 'Blimpy'
 The Doctor Takes a Wife (1940) - Wedding Celebrant (uncredited)
 The Lady in Question (1940) - Fat Boy
 Remedy for Riches (1940) - First Hotel Clerk (uncredited)
 The Diary of a Chambermaid (1946) - Pierre (uncredited)
 Hop Harrigan (1946) - Tank Tinker
 Bury Me Dead (1947) - Cab Driver (uncredited)
 Big Town After Dark (1947) - Harvey Cushman--Reporter (uncredited)
 My Girl Tisa (1948) - Georgie
 The Crooked Way (1949) - Man with Nina at Bar (uncredited)
 The Fighting Kentuckian (1949) - Knox Brown - Head Fiddler (uncredited)
 No Man of Her Own (1950) - John Larrimore (uncredited)
 Perfect Strangers (1950) - John Simon
 No Sad Songs for Me (1950) - George Spears (uncredited)
 Union Station (1950) - Police Car Driver (uncredited)
 The Fuller Brush Girl (1950) - Magazine Salesman (uncredited)
 Last of the Buccaneers (1950) - Paul DeLorie (uncredited)
 Flame of Stamboul (1951) - Charlie (uncredited)
 Insurance Investigator (1951) - Insurance Agent (uncredited)
 Lightning Strikes Twice (1951) - Rancher (uncredited)
 Chain of Circumstance (1951) - Fred Martindale
 Bannerline (1951) - Eddie (uncredited)
 Island in the Sky (1953) - Lt. Cord
 The Sad Sack (1957) - Fat Soldier (uncredited)

External links
 

1906 births
1990 deaths
Male actors from Oakland, California
American male film actors
American male silent film actors
20th-century American male actors